Aranka Binder (born 19 June 1966) is a Serbian sport shooter of Hungarian ethnicity. She won a bronze medal in Women's Air Rifle in the 1992 Summer Olympics.

References
 
 

1966 births
Hungarians in Vojvodina
Serbian female sport shooters
ISSF rifle shooters
Shooters at the 1992 Summer Olympics
Shooters at the 2000 Summer Olympics
Olympic shooters as Independent Olympic Participants
Olympic shooters of Yugoslavia
Olympic bronze medalists as Independent Olympic Participants
Living people
Olympic medalists in shooting
Sportspeople from Sombor
Medalists at the 1992 Summer Olympics
Mediterranean Games bronze medalists for Serbia
Competitors at the 2005 Mediterranean Games
Mediterranean Games medalists in shooting